Malcolm Williams may refer to:

 Malcolm Williams (American football) (born 1987), American football cornerback
 Malcolm Williams (Canadian football) (born 1993), Canadian football wide receiver
 Malcolm Williams (actor) (1870–1937), American stage actor
 Malcolm Williams (cricketer) (born 1949), Guyanese cricketer